Susan Ackerman (born September 24, 1958) is an American Hebrew Bible scholar. She is Preston H. Kelsey Professor of Religion, Professor of Women's, Gender, and Sexuality Studies, and Professor of Jewish Studies at Dartmouth College, where she has taught since 1990. Before coming to Dartmouth she taught at the University of Arizona and Winthrop College in South Carolina. She specializes in the religion of ancient Israel and the religions of Israel's neighbors (Mesopotamia, Egypt, and Canaan), especially women's religious history.

Ackerman studied at Dartmouth College (A.B., 1980) and Harvard University (M.T.S., 1980; Ph.D. 1987). Her dissertation was entitled “Syncretism in Israel as Reflected in Sixth-Century Prophetic Texts.” 

She has been president of the American Schools of Oriental Research since 2014.

Bibliography 
 When Heroes Love: The Ambiguity of Eros in the Stories of Gilgamesh and David (Columbia University Press, 2005).
 Warrior, Dancer, Seductress, Queen: Women in Judges and Biblical Israel (Doubleday, 1998).
 Under Every Green Tree: Popular Religion in Sixth-Century Judah (Scholars Press, 1992).

References

1958 births
Living people
American biblical scholars
Old Testament scholars
Female biblical scholars
Dartmouth College alumni
Dartmouth College faculty
Harvard Divinity School alumni
University of Arizona faculty
Winthrop University faculty
Place of birth missing (living people)